Normal! is a 2011 Algerian drama film written and directed by Merzak Allouache. It won the award for Best Film at the 2011 Doha Tribeca Film Festival.

Cast
 Nabil Asli as Nabil
 Adila Bendimerad as Amina
 Mina Lachter as Mina
 Nouah Matlouti as Lamia
 Nadjib Oulebsir as Fouzi

References

External links
 

2011 films
2011 drama films
2010s Arabic-language films
Films directed by Merzak Allouache
Algerian drama films